The brown nightjar (Veles binotatus) is a species of nightjar in the family Caprimulgidae. It is the only species in the genus Veles. It is found in Cameroon, Central African Republic, Republic of the Congo, Democratic Republic of the Congo, Ivory Coast, Gabon, Ghana, and Liberia.

References

brown nightjar
Birds of the African tropical rainforest
brown nightjar
brown nightjar
Taxonomy articles created by Polbot